Cristian Nunez may refer to:

 Cristian Nuñez (soccer, born 1988), Canadian footballer
 Cristian Núñez (footballer, born 1980), Argentine footballer
 Cristian Núñez (footballer, born 1997), Paraguayan footballer
 Cristian Núñez (footballer, born 2000), Paraguayan footballer

See also
 Christian Núñez (born 1982), Uruguayan footballer